Thor Lange may refer to:

 Thor Lange (writer) (1851–1915), Danish writer
 Thor Lange (footballer) (born 1993), Danish-Norwegian footballer